In classical logic, intuitionistic logic and similar logical systems, the principle of explosion ('from falsehood, anything [follows]'; or ), or the principle of Pseudo-Scotus (falsely attributed to Duns Scotus), is the law according to which any statement can be proven from a contradiction. That is, once a contradiction has been asserted, any proposition (including their negations) can be inferred from it; this is known as deductive explosion.

The proof of this principle was first given by 12th-century French philosopher William of Soissons. Due to the principle of explosion, the existence of a contradiction (inconsistency) in a formal axiomatic system is disastrous; since any statement can be proven, it trivializes the concepts of truth and falsity. Around the turn of the 20th century, the discovery of contradictions such as Russell's paradox at the foundations of mathematics thus threatened the entire structure of mathematics.  Mathematicians such as Gottlob Frege, Ernst Zermelo, Abraham Fraenkel, and Thoralf Skolem put much effort into revising set theory to eliminate these contradictions, resulting in the modern Zermelo–Fraenkel set theory.

As a demonstration of the principle, consider two contradictory statements—"All lemons are yellow" and "Not all lemons are yellow"—and suppose that both are true. If that is the case, anything can be proven, e.g., the assertion that "unicorns exist", by using the following argument:
 We know that "Not all lemons are yellow", as it has been assumed to be true.
 We know that "All lemons are yellow", as it has been assumed to be true.
 Therefore, the two-part statement "All lemons are yellow or unicorns exist" must also be true, since the first part "All lemons are yellow" of the two-part statement is true (as this has been assumed).
 However, since we know that "Not all lemons are yellow" (as this has been assumed), the first part is false, and hence the second part must be true to ensure the two-part statement to be true, i.e., unicorns exist.

In a different solution to these problems, a few mathematicians have devised alternative theories of logic called paraconsistent logics, which eliminate the principle of explosion. These allow some contradictory statements to be proven without affecting other proofs.

Symbolic representation
In symbolic logic, the principle of explosion can be expressed schematically in the following way:

Proof
Below is a formal proof of the principle using symbolic logic.

This is just the symbolic version of the informal argument given in the introduction, with  standing for "all lemons are yellow" and  standing for "Unicorns exist". We start out by assuming that (1) all lemons are yellow and that (2) not all lemons are yellow. From the proposition that all lemons are yellow, we infer that (3) either all lemons are yellow or unicorns exist. But then from this and the fact that not all lemons are yellow, we infer that (4) unicorns exist by disjunctive syllogism.

Semantic argument
An alternate argument for the principle stems from model theory. However, there is no model of the contradictory set .

Paraconsistent logic

Paraconsistent logics have been developed that allow for subcontrary-forming operators. Alternatively, they reject the idea that propositions can be classified as true or false. Proof-theoretic paraconsistent logics usually deny the validity of one of the steps necessary for deriving an explosion, typically including disjunctive syllogism, disjunction introduction, and reductio ad absurdum.

Usage
The metamathematical value of the principle of explosion is that for any logical system where this principle holds, any derived theory which proves ⊥ (or an equivalent form) is worthless because all its statements would become theorems, making it impossible to distinguish truth from falsehood. That is to say, the principle of explosion is an argument for the law of non-contradiction in classical logic, because without it all truth statements become meaningless. 

Reduction in proof strength of logics without ex falso are discussed in minimal logic.

See also
 Consequentia mirabilis – Clavius' Law
 Dialetheism – belief in the existence of true contradictions
 Law of excluded middle – every proposition is true or false
 Law of noncontradiction – no proposition can be both true and not true
 Paraconsistent logic – a family of logics used to address contradictions
 Paradox of entailment – a seeming paradox derived from the principle of explosion
 Reductio ad absurdum – concluding that a proposition is false because it produces a contradiction
 Trivialism – the belief that all statements of the form "P and not-P" are true

References

Theorems in propositional logic
Classical logic
Principles